Rush hour is the two parts of the day with busy traffic caused by commuting.

Rush hour may also refer to:

Film
 The Rush Hour, a 1928 American silent comedy film
 Rush Hour (1941 film), a British film
 Rush Hour (2006 film), a Russian film
 Rush Hour (franchise), a series of American action comedy films
 Rush Hour (1998 film), the first film in the series

Games
 Rush Hour (puzzle), a 1996 sliding block puzzle
 Rush Hour (video game), a 1997 racing game
 SimCity 4: Rush Hour, a 2003 expansion pack for SimCity 4

Music

Albums
 Rush Hour (Joe Lovano album), 1995
 Rush Hour (soundtrack), the soundtrack to the 1998 film

Songs
 "Rush Hour" (Armin van Buuren composition), an instrumental, 2007
 "Rush Hour" (Christopher Lawrence composition), an instrumental, 2004
 "Rush Hour" (Crush song), 2022
 "Rush Hour" (Jane Wiedlin song), 1988
 "Rush Hour", a song by Juice WRLD
 "Rush Hour", by Brad from Best Friends?, 2010

Television and radio
 Rush Hour (American TV series), a 2016 series based on the film series
 Rush Hour (British TV series), a 2007 sketch show
 Час пик, (English: Rush Hour), a Russian TV show hosted by Vladislav Listyev
 The Rush Hour Triple M, branding for several sport- and comedy-themed radio shows on the Triple M network in Australia

See also
Dayparting
Drive time
Morning drive